The Parrots (Prohibition of Import) Regulations, 1930 was created to prevent the importation of parrots into the UK following consideration by the permanent Committee of the Office international d'hygiène publique, after the appearance of psittacosis in the worldwide 1929–1930 psittacosis pandemic. It added further duties for port medical officers of health. Parrots for research were exempt, but not parrots brought home by serviceman.

References

Public health in the United Kingdom